Goldbloom is a surname. Notable people with the surname include:

Michael Goldbloom (born 1953), Canadian lawyer, publisher, and academic administrator; son of Victor Goldbloom
Richard Goldbloom (born 1924), Canadian pediatrician, professor, and academic administrator
Victor Goldbloom (1923–2016), Canadian pediatrician, lecturer, and politician

See also
Goldblum